Sheldon Parkinson (born August 3, 1990 in Montego Bay, Jamaica) is a Jamaican-American footballer who currently plays for New Amsterdam FC in the National Independent Soccer Association.

Parkinson signed for Phoenix FC in February 2013, making his first start on April 14 in the 3-1 loss to the Los Angeles Blues.  Although his debut appearance was tough, he quickly became a fan favorite because of his intense drive to always improve and his clear enjoyment of the game.

Parkinson played collegiately at Mercer County College and later at New Jersey City University in 2012. At NJCU, Parkinson earned Honorable Mention All-NJAC status in Fall 2012 despite missing a portion of the season due to injury. His most notable game as a Gothic Knight came in the ECAC Metro Quarterfinals on November 9, 2012 when he stopped four of seven Brooklyn College penalty kicks in a shootout to help NJCU advance to the semifinals after a 3-3 deadlock. In 13 games for NJCU he had a 2.34 GAA and 5-6-1 record, making 87 saves in 1153:35 minutes while facing 232 shots. He was studying Business Management with a concentration in sports management.

Prior to NJCU, he played at Mercer County Community College. He was a 2008 NSCAA/adidas Men’s Junior College Division I Second-Team All-America pick. After not playing in 2009 and 2010, he returned to the pitch in 2011 and was an NJCAA All-Region 19 Division I First-Team selection and the No. 5 ranked player in Region 19. He also was named First-Team All-Region 19 and First-Team Division I All-Garden State Athletic Conference in 2008 and 2011. In 2010, he was named to the Super-20 All-Tournament Second Team as part of the Red Bull New York U-23 team that won the championship. He allowed four goals in five games for that club.

In 2008 at Mercer he had a 0.855 GAA, 37 saves, 11 goals against in 12 games, while facing 48 shots on goal in 1158 minutes. In 2011, he had a 1.345 GAA, 42 saves, 15 GA in 13 games versus 57 SOG in 1004 minutes.

Parkinson played four seasons of varsity soccer for Coach Patrick Straw at Herbert H. Lehman High in the Bronx, NY. The 2008 graduate earned PSAL All-City honors. He also played volleyball for three years, also claiming PSAL All-City accolades. He ran track and played basketball in the winter.

Parkinson was born in Montego Bay, Jamaica and lived there for 12 years. He is a huge fan of words/language tries to be creative with his words. His favorite sports team is Liverpool F.C.

External links
 USL Pro profile 
 NJCU Gothic Knight profile
 NJCU vs. Brooklyn, 2012 ECAC Quarterfinals

1990 births
Living people
Jamaican footballers
Jamaican expatriate footballers
Phoenix FC players
Expatriate soccer players in the United States
USL Championship players
Association football goalkeepers
Jamaican expatriate sportspeople in the United States
Soccer players from New Jersey
New York Red Bulls U-23 players
New Jersey City Gothic Knights
New Jersey City University alumni
MCCC Vikings men's soccer players
New Amsterdam FC players
Brooklyn Italians players